Brian Gutierrez is an American politician. In 2013, he was appointed to the California State Council on Developmental Disabilities. .

Gutierrez is from West Covina. He is a graduate of Nogales High School. As a Nogales High School student, Gutierrez raised over $100,000 for after school programs and advocated for the Rowland Unified School Police to be equipped with police radios to ensure in case of an emergency the Department had the resources to seek help from local agencies like the West Covina Police and Los Angeles County Sheriff's Department.

Including working with National Latin Artist like Marco Antonio Solis, Joan Sebastian, Juan Gabriel and World Soccer Star Cristiano Ronaldo. Gutierrez recognize each of these Artist for helping others and for creating Autism Awareness.

Prior to working as a California State Council member, Gutierrez worked as a senior advisor to both a State Senator and Assemblymember .

References

External links
 
  
 

Living people
People from West Covina, California
Politicians from Los Angeles
Year of birth missing (living people)